HSC INCAT 046 was a wave-piercing catamaran passenger-vehicle ferry.  It operated under various marketing names, including Devil Cat, The Cat, The Lynx, and lastly The T&T Express.

Vessel characteristics
HSC INCAT 046 was a  vessel built by InCat Australia in Hobart, Tasmania, in 1997 as hull 046.  She was a sister ship to HSC Express (holder of a Trans-Atlantic speed record), HSC Max Mols and HSC Master Cat, all of which are Incat91 models.

INCAT 046 was constructed from marine-grade aluminium alloys. Each water-borne hull was subdivided into multiple watertight compartments connected by an arched bridging structure with a central forward hull above the smooth water line.  Each water-borne hull carried two engines which drove water jets mounted on the transom.

Vehicles were stowed in and between both waterborne hulls in a configuration of rising and descending decks which loaded from a single-level transfer bridge at the stern.  The main passenger deck was immediately above the vehicle decks and consisted of a cafe, gift shop, children's play area and passenger seating lounges, as well as an outside observation deck that ran the width of the ship at the stern.  The passenger seating lounges had overhead television monitors which played movies or television broadcasts, as well as a continuously updated map showing the vessel's GPS coordinates.  A smaller secondary passenger deck was located one deck up and has a bar immediately aft of the wheelhouse.

Service history

TT-Line (1997–1998, 2000–2001, 2001–2002)
HSC INCAT 046 was constructed for TT-Line and operated across Australia's Bass Strait on the world's longest-distance high-speed ferry service (marketed as Devil Cat), between Station Pier, Port Melbourne, Victoria to The Esplanade, George Town, Tasmania. Weather conditions in the Bass Strait often led to cancellation during storms and heavy seas, with five cancellations in the first ten weeks of operating. The vessel's ride during choppy conditions led to its nickname "Spew Cat". The ship was sold to Bay Ferries after the first season, but during the 2000–2001, 2001–2002 summer peak periods it was charted to again run the George Town–Station Pier route as the Devil Cat.

Bay Ferries (1998–2002)
The INCAT 046 was sold to Bay Ferries in 1998 for service on that company's Gulf of Maine route between Yarmouth, Nova Scotia, and Bar Harbor, Maine, under the marketing name The Cat.  The vessel departed Hobart on April 26, 1998, arriving in Yarmouth on May 20, 1998, to great fanfare from the American and Canadian news media.

On September 4, 1998, the vessel collided with a fishing boat in Yarmouth Harbour in thick fog. The vessel was heading out of the harbour when it collided with the Lady Megan II, which was entering the harbour after a two-day fishing trip on Georges Bank. The vessel crushed the smaller fishing boat, killing the captain, but the three crew members survived.

The vessel operated seasonally on the Yarmouth–Bar Harbor route from May–October. In early 2002, HSC INCAT 046 was sold to Incat by Bay Ferries, as a trade-in for the newer and larger-capacity HSC The Cat, which, in the case of this vessel, is its official registered name.

Interisland Line (2002–2003)
The vessel was leased by Incat to the Interisland Line, a New Zealand company, for which it was used in the Cook Strait that year, using the marketing name The Lynx; however, operating issues relating to its wake saw the vessel returned to Incat in early 2003 where it was laid up in Hobart.

Bay Ferries (2003–2006)
Bay Ferries subsequently repurchased the vessel and leased it under a wet charter (crewed and operated by Bay Ferries) for a route in Trinidad and Tobago between Port of Spain and Scarborough.  Bay Ferries maintained the Interisland Line's marketing graphics on the vessel and referred to it as The Lynx during this period.

Government of Trinidad and Tobago (2006–2021)
The vessel was purchased from Bay Ferries by the Government of Trinidad and Tobago's Ministry of Works and Transport in 2006. She maintained the official registered name of INCAT 046 but was marketed as the T&T Express and operated by Bay Ferries Management Ltd. on behalf of the government.

Transmapi (2021)
The vessel sank after being sold by the TT Government on its journey to Spain to its new owners, Transmapi.

Sister ships
 , operated by P&O Irish Sea
 , operated by Mols Linien

References

External links
 Tassie Devils
 Ship Technology site
 The Ferry Site

Ships built by Incat
Ferries of Nova Scotia
Ferries of Maine
Ferries of Trinidad and Tobago
Cook Strait ferries
Bass Strait ferries
Incat high-speed craft
1997 ships
Ferries of Spain
Shipwrecks in the Atlantic Ocean